Anoopgarh is a city located, just 126 km from Sri Ganganagar district in the state of Rajasthan, India. Located in Anoopgarh District, it is the headquarters of the Anoopgarh District. On 17 March 2023, Anoopgarh is declared district by CM of rajasthan, with about 6 or 7 Tehsils. It takes about 42% of district sriganganagar.

Geography
 Anoopgarh/Anupgarh has an average elevation of 155 metres (508 feet), and is very close to the border with Pakistan. The fort at Anoopgarh was built about 1689 by the Mughal governor to help suppress the local Bhati Rajputs who were rebelling.

Demographics

In the 2011 census, the town of Anoopgarh had a population of 30,877, with male population of 16,343 and female population of 14,534.

In the 2001 India census, the town of Anoopgarh had a population of 29,548. Males constituted 54% of the population and females 46%. Anoopgarh had an average literacy rate of 61.2%, higher than the national average of 59.5%; with 67.3% of the males and 54.0% of females literate. In 2001 in Anoopgarh, 15.6% of the population was under six years of age.

Hindus are in majority in the town, followed by a significant Sikh minority, followed by a small Muslim population.

References

External links 
 
 

Cities and towns in Sri Ganganagar district